Dresden is one of the three former Direktionsbezirke of Saxony, Germany, located in the east of the state. It coincided with the Planungsregionen Oberlausitz-Niederschlesien and Oberes Elbtal/Osterzgebirge. 

It was disbanded in March 2012.

History
The Direktionsbezirk Dresden came into existence on 1 August 2008, and succeeded the Dresden Government Region.

Administrative divisions

See also
Bezirk Dresden

References

External links
Official website

Geography of Saxony
NUTS 2 statistical regions of the European Union
States and territories established in 1991
Former government regions of Germany